Aho-dong is a dong in Munsal-li, Paechon, South Hwanghae Province, North Korea, located at coordinates 37.8942 N, 126.3742 E. The city is immediately north of the South Korean-North Korean border, which is 7 km from the city center. Its approximate population is 23,553. The dong's altitude is 6 feet, or approximately 2 meters. Nearby cities and towns include Chiroe-dong. The dong is also called ajeochidong and is named as such after a swamp that was full of geese.

References
(Fallingrain: Maps, Weather, and Airports for Chasong-up, Korea, Dem. Peoples Rep. of (North))

Villages in North Korea
South Hwanghae